Axel Óskar Andrésson (born 27 January 1998) is an Icelandic professional footballer who plays as a centre-back for Superettan club Örebro.

Club career
Axel started his career in the youth team of local side Ungmennafélagið Afturelding before he was promoted to the first team at only the age of sixteen, going on to represent the side eleven times in the 2014 2. deild karla season. After impressing for Afturelding he was invited for a trial in England for the youth team at Reading.

Reading 
In July 2014, Axel joined Reading permanently, signing a two-year scholarship with the club. In July 2016 he graduated from the under-18 side having already committed to signing his first professional contract with the club. Having moved up to the under-23 squad, Axel was sent out on loan to gain some first team experience at National League South side Bath City in November 2016. Axel impressed during his time with the Romans scoring five goals from defence, and was even promoted to captain despite only being aged nineteen. He went on to make a total of eighteen appearances for Bath in all competitions. He was promoted to the first team upon his return to Reading in the summer of 2017, and made his professional and first team debut in the EFL Cup win over Gillingham on 8 August. On 6 December 2017, Axel joined Torquay United on a one-month youth loan deal until 6 January 2018.

On 15 August 2018, Axel signed a new contract with Reading, until the summer of 2020, and then immediately joined Norwegian 1. divisjon club Viking FK on loan until the end of their 2018 season.

Viking 
On 21 December 2018, Viking FK announced the signing of Axel on a three-year contract for an undisclosed fee.
During the opening game of the 2019 season on 31 March against Kristiansund, Axel suffered a season-ending knee ligament injury.

Riga FC 
On 8 February 2021, Axel signed for Latvian club Riga FC. On 25 March 2022, Axel and Riga terminated their contract by mutual agreement.

Örebro
On 25 March 2022, Örebro announced the singing of Axel to a three-year contract.

International career
Axel has represented Iceland at under-17, under-19 and under-21 level. In December 2018, Axel got his first call-up for the Iceland national football team. 
He made his debut for the squad on 11 January 2019 in a friendly against Sweden, as a 70th-minute substitute for Eiður Sigurbjörnsson.

Personal life
Axel is the son of Andrés Guðmundsson, a former international strongman competitor and former holder of the World Strongman Challenge title.

His younger brother is Jökull Andrésson, who is also contracted to Reading.

Career statistics

Club

International

Honours
Viking FK
1. divisjon: 2018

References

External links

1998 births
Living people
Axel Oskar Andresson
Association football defenders
Axel Oskar Andresson
Axel Oskar Andresson
Axel Oskar Andresson
Axel Oskar Andresson
Bath City F.C. players
Reading F.C. players
Torquay United F.C. players
Viking FK players
Riga FC players
Örebro SK players
National League (English football) players
Norwegian First Division players
Eliteserien players
Latvian Higher League players
Superettan players
Axel Oskar Andresson
Expatriate footballers in England
Axel Oskar Andresson
Expatriate footballers in Norway
Axel Oskar Andresson
Expatriate footballers in Latvia
Axel Oskar Andresson
Expatriate footballers in Sweden
Axel Oskar Andresson